Walt is a masculine given name, generally a short form of Walter, and occasionally a surname. Notable people with the name include:

People

Given name
 Walt Arfons (1916-2013), American drag racer and competition land speed record racer
 Walt Bellamy (1939-2013), American National Basketball Association player, two-time Basketball Hall of Fame inductee
 Walt Bellamy (ice hockey) (1881-1941), Canadian hockey player
 Walter Blackman, American member of the Arizona House of Representatives 
 Walt Bowyer (born 1960), American former National Football League player
 Walt Brown (politician) (born 1926), American politician
 Walt Clago (1899-1955), American football player
 Walt Corey (born 1938), American former National Football League player 
 Walt Disney (1901-1966), American film producer, director, screenwriter, voice actor, animator, entrepreneur and philanthropist
 Walt Dropo (1923-2010), American Major League Baseball and college basketball player
 Walt Frazier (born 1945), American National Basketball Association player, member of the Basketball Hall of Fame
 Walt Handelsman (born 1956), American editorial cartoonist, twice winner of the Pulitzer Prize
 Walt Harris (coach) (born 1946), American retired college football player and coach and National Football League coach
 Walt Harris (cornerback) (born 1974), American former National Football League player
 Walt Hazzard (1942-2011), American college and National Basketball Association player and college basketball coach
 Walt Housman (born 1962), American former football player
 Walt Jocketty (born 1951), American baseball executive
 Walt Kellner (1929-2006), American baseball player
 Walt Kiesling (1903-1962), American Hall-of-Fame National Football League player and coach
 Walt Kelly (1913-1973), American cartoonist best known for the comic strip Pogo
 Walt Kowalczyk (born 1935), American former college football and National Football League player
 Walt Lamb (1920-1991), American football player
 Walt Lemon Jr. (born 1992), American basketball player in the Israel Basketball Premier League
 Walt Radzick (1935-2005), Canadian Football League player
 Walt Schmetzer (born 1967), American former soccer player
 Walt Simonson (born 1946), American comic book writer and artist
 Walt Singer (1911-1992), American football player
 Walt Szot (1920-1981), American National Football League player
 Walt Torrence (1936/1937–1969), American basketball player
 Walt Uzdavinis (1911-1988), American football player
 Walt Weiss (born 1963), American former Major League Baseball player and manager
 Walt Whitman (1819-1892), American poet, essayist, journalist and humanist
 Walt Zirinsky (1920-2001), American football player

Surname
 Lewis William Walt (1913–1989), United States Marine Corps four-star general
 Martin Walt, professor of electrical engineering at Stanford University, father of Stephen Walt
 Sherman Walt (1923–1989), American bassoonist
 Stephen Walt (born 1955), American professor of international affairs

Fictional characters
 Walt Lloyd, on the television series Lost
 Walt Longmire, on the television series Longmire
 Walt Stone, from the series The Kane Chronicles
 Walt Wallet, in the newspaper comic strip Gasoline Alley

See also
 Van der Walt, a list of people with the surname

English-language masculine given names
Hypocorisms
English masculine given names